The Pink Cloud is a 2021 Brazilian science fiction thriller film written and directed by Iuli Gerbase in her directional debut. The setting of the story in the film has been compared to the COVID-19 pandemic, although written and directed earlier, in 2017 and 2019 respectively. The film stars Renata de Lélis, Eduardo Mendonça, Kaya Rodrigues, Helena Becker, and Girley Paes.

The film had its world premiere at the Sundance Film Festival on 29 January 2021.

Cast
The cast include:
 Renata de Lélis as Giovana
 Eduardo Mendonça as Yago
 Kaya Rodrigues as Sara
 Helena Becker as Júlia
 Girley Paes as Rui

Release
The film had its world premiere at the Sundance Film Festival on 29 January 2021 in the World Cinema Dramatic Competition section.

Reception
The review aggregator website Rotten Tomatoes surveyed  and, categorizing the reviews as positive or negative, assessed 33 as positive and 2 as negative for a 95% rating. Among the reviews, it determined an average rating of 7.5 out of 10. The critics consensus reads "An eerily relevant debut from writer-director Iuli Gerbase, The Pink Cloud reaches into the emotional fault lines of pandemic life and comes away with striking observations about human behavior."

References

External links
 
 

2021 science fiction films
2021 thriller films
2021 independent films
2020s science fiction thriller films
Brazilian science fiction thriller films
Brazilian independent films